Millennium Square may refer to:

Millennium Square, Bristol
Millennium Square, Leeds
Millennium Square, Sheffield